Le sorprese dell'amore ("Surprise of Love") is a 1959 Italian romantic comedy film written and directed by Luigi Comencini.

Cast 

Dorian Gray as Didì
Walter Chiari as Ferdinando
Anna Maria Ferrero as  Mariarosa
Sylva Koscina as  Marianna
Franco Fabrizi as  Battista
Mario Carotenuto as  Don Maurizio
Elena Zareschi as  Carlotta
Vittorio Gassman as the schoolmaster
Valeria Fabrizi as  Mimma
Carletto Sposito as  Gaspare
Memmo Carotenuto as the taxi driver
Angela Luce

References

External links

1959 films
Italian romantic comedy films
1959 romantic comedy films
Films directed by Luigi Comencini
Films with screenplays by Ruggero Maccari
1950s Italian films